W. Somerset Maugham (1874 – 1965) was a British playwright, novelist and short story writer. Born in the British Embassy in Paris, where his father worked, Maugham was an orphan by the age of ten. He was raised by an uncle, who tried to persuade the youngster to become an accountant or parson; Maugham instead trained as a doctor, although he never practised professionally, as his first novel, Liza of Lambeth, was published the same year he qualified.

A year after his first novel was published Maugham began contributing to magazines and periodicals; initially these were short stories, but he also wrote opinion pieces, non-fictional and autobiographical work, and letters. Much of his non-fictional writing was published in book form, and covered a range of topics, including travel, current affairs, autobiography and belles lettres. Maugham was also editor on a number of works, which often included adding a preface or introductory chapter to the work of other writers. In 1903 his first play was performed, A Man of Honour at the Imperial Theatre, London. It was the first of many of his works that were produced for the stage, and with the later development of cinema, his novels and stories were also adapted for the big screen.

By the time of his death in 1965 Maugham was one of the most commercially successful and gifted writers of the twentieth century, according to Bryan Connon, his biographer; The Times obituarist called Maugham "the most assured English writer of his time", and wrote that "no writer of his generation ... graced the world of English letters with more complete or more polished assurance".

Novels and story collections

Publications in periodicals

Collected editions

Editor

Plays

Non-fiction

Notes and references
Notes

References

Sources

External links

 
 
 
 
 

Bibliographies by writer
Bibliographies of British writers
Dramatist and playwright bibliographies